The Darmstadt Madonna (also known as the Madonna of Jakob Meyer zum Hasen) is an oil painting by Hans Holbein the Younger. Completed in 1526 in Basel, the work shows the Bürgermeister of Basel Jakob Meyer zum Hasen, his first wife (who had died earlier), his current wife, and his daughter grouped around the Madonna and infant Jesus.

The meaning of the two other male figures on the left side (the Madonna's right) is, like the overall iconography of the image, not entirely clear. Franny Moyle writes that the man on the Madonna's right is Meyer, and "[t]he boy and baby may be a presentation of Meyer's two deceased sons...." The image testified to the resolutely Catholic faith of the Bürgermeister, who actively opposed the Reformation.

Holbein's Darmstadt Madonna was influenced by Italian Renaissance religious painting; Franny Moyle writes that it was influenced by Andrea Mantegna's 1496 Madonna della Vittoria, and that the two paintings' "perspectival approach ... is almost identical." The Darmstadt Madonna may also contain elements of Netherlandish portrait painting.

Earlier located in Darmstadt, hence its title, the work was on loan to the Städelschen Kunstinstitut in Frankfurt am Main from 2004 to 2011.
In 2012, the painting was put on display in the Johanniterkirche in Schwäbisch Hall as part of the permanent exhibition of the Old Masters in the Würth Collection.

See also
 List of most expensive paintings

References

Further reading

All of the following texts are in German:
 Hans Holbeins Madonna im Städel. Der Bürgermeister, sein Maler und seine Familie. Exhibit Catalog, Petersberg 2004, . 
 Oskar Bätschmann, Pascal Griener: Hans Holbein d. J. Die Darmstädter Madonna. Original gegen Fälschung. Fischer, Frankfurt 1998. 
 Christl Auge: Zur Deutung der Darmstädter Madonna. Lang, Frankfurt am Main 1993. 
 Günther Grundmann: Die Darmstädter Madonna. Eduard Roether, Darmstadt 1959.
 Theodor Gaedertz: Hans Holbein der Jüngere und seine Madonna des Bürgermeisters Meyer. Mit den Abbildungen der Darmstädter und der Dresdener Madonna. Bolhoevener, Lübeck 1872.
 Gustav Theodor Fechner: Ueber die Aechtheitsfrage der Holbein’schen Madonna: Discussion und Acten. Breitkopf & Härtel, Leipzig 1871.
 Dr. Georg Haupt: Der Darmstadter Museumsstreit. Eine Verteidigungsschrift, Jena, Diederichs 1904.

Paintings of the Madonna and Child
Paintings by Hans Holbein the Younger
1526 paintings